Maryculter or Kirkton of Maryculter is a village in the Lower Deeside area of Aberdeenshire, Scotland.  The River Dee separates it from the town of Peterculter, and the B979 road runs through Maryculter. Maryculter House Hotel lies slightly north of the village along the south bank of the River Dee and to the west of Templars Park. The Old Mill Inn, a former coaching inn dating back to the 18th century lay at the mouth of the Crynoch Burn from 1797 until its demolition in February 2021 after being damaged by an extensive fire. At the edge of the village of Maryculter is a public forest land, known as the Oldman Wood, through which flows the Crynoch Burn. Also the children's theme park, StoryBook Glen, which also consists of a shop and restaurant is located near the old church which is still in use today as a Church of Scotland.  Other notable vicinity buildings include the former Lairhillock Inn which closed in March 2020 and Muchalls Castle. Maryculter also has an animal sanctuary, Blaikiewell Animal Sanctuary.

Ancient history

Traces of early peoples from the Stone Age to the Iron Age have been found in the area. Prehistoric habitation in the Maryculter area is known through archaeological sites such as Balbridie situated somewhat west of Maryculter. Roman legions marched from Raedykes to Normandykes, marching slightly west of Maryculter, as they sought higher ground evading the bogs of Red Moss and other low-lying mosses associated with the Burn of Muchalls. That march used the Elsick Mounth, one of the ancient trackways crossing the Grampian Mountains, lying west of Netherley.

Notable residents

Rev. Prof. George Glennie FRSE DD (1768-1845), minister, born and raised in the village
George John Robert Gordon (1812-1912), diplomat, born in Maryculter
Rev. William Selbie (1823-1895), minister of the Free Church in Maryculter from 1853 to 1895

Line notes

References
 John A. Henderson (1892) Annals of Lower Deeside: Being a Topographical, Proprietary, Ecclesiastical, and Antiquarian History of Durris, Drumoak, and Culter, D. Wyllie and Son, 271 pages
 C. Michael Hogan, Elsick Mounth, Megalithic Portal, ed A. Burnham

External links

Maryculter parish Church
Video footage of St Mary's Chapel at Maryculter House.

Bibliography

Nicol, Norman D (1999) Maryculter in the Eighteenth Century: Lairds, Kirk and People in a Lower Deeside Parish

Villages in Aberdeenshire